The Zeta Project is an American science fiction animated television series produced by Warner Bros. Animation. It first aired on Kids' WB in January 2001. It is a spin-off series based on the character Zeta from the Batman Beyond episode of the same name and the sixth series of the DC Animated Universe. The show was created by Robert Goodman and Warner Bros. Animation.

The story's main character, Infiltration Unit Zeta, is a humanoid robot (synthoid) designed to carry out covert assassinations on the behalf of the National Security Agency. When Zeta discovers that one of his targets is innocent, he experiences an existential crisis about goodness and the value of life; following this epiphany, Zeta finds that he can no longer kill. The newly enlightened Zeta refuses to continue on as an infiltration unit and abandons his mission, going rogue. Zeta is pursued by a team of NSA agents, led by the obsessed Agent Bennett, and is aided by a 15-year-old runaway, Rosalie "Ro" Rowan.

The series was cancelled after two seasons.

Overview
Inspired by Frankenstein, Blade Runner, and  The Fugitive, The Zeta Project follows the exploits of Zeta and Ro as they attempt to prove that he is genuinely non-violent, whereas the NSA agents pursuing him believe that the terrorists he was investigating before going rogue have reprogrammed him for some unknown purpose. To prove his innocence, Zeta and Ro search for his creator, the elusive Dr. Selig.

A spin-off of Batman Beyond, Bob Goodman initially pitched the show with plans to be darker than its point of origin, but when the pitch went to the Network, Kid's WB was looking for shows that would skew to a younger demographic, and The Zeta Project was ultimately picked up with the thought process "It's a Robot, and it's a teenage girl. How much fun can that be?" Promises were made by the show staff that most of the locations Zeta would encounter would not be as dark, gothic, and oppressive feeling as Batman Beyond's Gotham City. Among this, and other constraints, Bob's original vision for the show's messages on dark government, misuse of technology, and a wide range of social and political issues became more difficult to execute.

Despite the lighter tone adopted by the final product, Kid's WB still felt The Zeta Project was too dark all throughout its run, and almost canceled the show entirely following the September 11 attacks due to its plot lines involving terrorism and critical commentary on the NSA. Ultimately, the show went on for one more season before Goodman walked away, believing the networks demands were pushing the show too far away from his creative vision.

Characters

Infiltration Unit Zeta
Created in a lab just over a year ago, Zeta is like a child in a grown-up's body. He has a high-endurance metal frame, that was built to carry an array of weapons and tools. He can project a hologram around himself and alter his voice, allowing him to become anyone. He was created to fight the United States' enemies, but learned the value of human life and refused to harm a man he believed was innocent, threw away his weapons, and ran from his programmed destiny. Ever since, the government agents that controlled Zeta have been after him, convinced that he's been reprogrammed by terrorists. Zeta hopes that his creator, Selig, will believe that his change of heart is real, and convince the agents to drop their pursuit. But Selig himself is a man on the move, and Zeta hasn't found him yet. Though Zeta no longer possesses the vast array of weapons that he originally came equipped with, his arms are equipped with saw blades and cutting lasers. He also possesses a wide array of other non-lethal tools, such as handheld welding lasers, a computer interface, and an unlimited cred card. He's faster than a human. His "eyes" and "ears" pick up wavelengths outside human perception. And to a limited degree, he's self-repairing.

Rosalie "Ro" Rowan
Ro grew up in foster care, and was then assigned to a state-run girls' home. The only thing she even knows about her family is a vague memory of an older brother; the pair was separated by the foster care system years ago. She ran away from the state system at fifteen-years-old and hooked up with a gang just to have a roof over her head. But when she refused to do a hold-up to prove herself to the leader, she burned the last bridge she had. As she and Zeta search for his creator Ro embarks on a parallel journey on her own search for a "family" to belong to.  Ro is the source of humor for the series. She's also Zeta's guide to "passing" among humans, and teaches him all those endless lessons we all take for granted about being human. She is visually inspired by Priss from Blade Runner.

Special Agent James Bennet
Agent Bennet is the leader of the NSA team sent to capture Zeta. He vehemently believes that, regardless of Zeta's behavior, there is some sinister motive behind Zeta's sudden change in attitude and believes that he is working with the terrorist organization Brother's Day. Despite his supposed professionalism, he is seen to disobey orders himself, when it suits him, as well as abuse his authority. Although he overhears Dr. Selig's confession about giving Zeta a conscience, there is no sure sign that he will cease to be Zeta's enemy. Bennet is inspired by Lt. Philip Gerard from The Fugitive.

Dr. Eli Selig
Once the head of the government's Infiltration Unit Program, Doctor Eli Selig is the man who created Zeta. Selig knows Zeta's abilities and limitations better than anyone else on Earth. Since building Zeta, he's moved on to another government project—one far more confidential than his past work. At his current level of secrecy, Selig has become a phantom—appearing where and when his work demands, but always keeping his itinerary close to the vest. He will on occasion surface, to aid other scientists or lecture at conferences, but because his security is so sensitive, his appearances are never announced until the last minute.

Agent Orin West and Marcia Lee
Formerly Scout Unit Four, partner NSA Agent Orin West and Marcia Lee botch a chance to capture Zeta at the Wood Valley Maryland hoverbus station, and are assigned to Agent Bennet's personal detail as their punishment. Now West and Lee work right at Bennet's side (where he can keep an eye on them), dedicated to capturing Zeta.

West is a clumsy, overeager bumbler, constantly firing weapons too soon, tripping over his own feet and blowing chances to catch Zeta. Lucky for him, Lee's there to keep him in check. She's more controlled, and by-the-book—but Lee has her doubts about Zeta's guilt. She's willing to believe Zeta might really be peaceful - and that open-mindedness sometimes puts her at odds with Agent Bennet. Lee eventually leaves Bennet's team and is replaced by Agent Rush

While West shares a last name and is similar in appearance to Wally West (the Flash), who is also voiced by Rosenbaum. Showrunner Bob Goodman has stated this was coincidental.

Bucky Buenaventura
12 year old Bucky is a bona fide genius. Emancipated by his parents, he lives in an academic think tank. He's a hacker who loves to invade high security corporate computers and expose sensitive government secrets, just to show that he can and will give Big Brother the occasional goose. Unchecked by grown-ups, Bucky travels around freely, orchestrating his pranks—and keeping an interested eye on Zeta and Ro.

Infiltration Unit 7
IU7 is the next generation of Infiltration Unit to come after Zeta, which Agent Bennet unleashes with the sole assignment of capturing its robotic predecessor. This synthoid has the same mimicking skills as Zeta, but the metal frame beneath its hologram is larger, more powerful, and more heavily armed. IU7 still carries a dangerous arsenal of weapons—and has none of Zeta's compunctions about using it. Because of the extreme single-mindedness of IU7's programming, Zeta and Ro usually find ways to misdirect and outsmart the synthoid monster.

Cast

Protagonists

Supporting protagonists

Antagonists

Supporting antagonists

Episodes

Series overview

Season 1 (2001)

Season 2 (2002)

Broadcast history

United States
 Kids' WB (2001–2002)
Canada
 YTV (2001–2008)
 Teletoon (2004–2009)
United Kingdom
 Cartoon Network (2001–2008)
 Boomerang (2008)
 Sky1 (2001–2002)

Australia
 Cartoon Network (2001–2008)
 Nine Network (2001–2003)
France
 Cartoon Network (2001–2003)
Brazil
 Cartoon Network (2001–2007)
 SBT (2003–2015; 2021–present)
 Tooncast (2021–present)
Chile
 Chilevision (2010–2018)
 Boomerang (2007–2009)
 Canal 13 (2005–2013)
Venezuela
 Venevisión (2005–2008)
 Boomerang (2007–2009)

Latin America
 Boomerang (2007–2009)
 Cartoon Network (2001–2007)
 Tooncast (2021–present)
Middle East
 MBC 3 (2007–2010)
New Zealand
 TVNZ 2 (2003–2009)
Russia
 STS (2002–2003)
Mexico
 Canal 5 (2008–2010)
 Las Estrellas (2004–2006)
Republic of Ireland
 RTÉ Two (2001–2002)

Cancellation and future
Following the September 11 attacks, Kid's WB considered canceling The Zeta Project, but Bob Goodman convinced them he could keep the show running without even mentioning terrorists. However, Kid's WB demanded that if the show were to be picked up for a third season, this season needed to end on a cliffhanger that appeared to kill Zee's creator, Dr. Selig. Eventually, Kid's WB! told Bob that the finale would be the end of Zeta's search for Selig, and that a third season would reveal that Ro was also a robot, and follow the "Scooby-Doo", adventure of the week, formula. Tired of network demands getting in the way of his vision, Bob ultimately quit the show. Interviews were held to replace him as show runner, but enthusiasm for the show lowered following his exit.

In December 2004, John Schneider revealed he was working on a filmed version of the show with series creator Bob Goodman. Bob later expanded, saying Warner Bros. Television Studios was interested in adapting the show in an hour long format. As producers, John and Bob developed a live action series that took liberties with the Zeta concept to fit the sensibilities of the network at the time, which included lessening the similarities to The Fugitive, since the recent reboot underperformed expectations. The show would have featured Ro working in the FBI's cyber crimes unit, with Zee having replaced her partner in the pilot. The show would have had them solving cases week to week while hunting down Zeta's creator and Ro's family.

Over the years, Bob Goodman stated he would love to have a chance to finish the story, and has expressed willingness to do so in comic form or long-form straight-to-DVD format. Over the years, he has hinted at many plot points for the unproduced seasons, including:
 the hand seen in the cliffhanger being revealed to belong to Andrea Donoso, Selig's assistant/synthoid, who was charged with the solitary job of protecting him,
 Selig having a new plan with important work for Zeta,
 Ro's search for her family, focusing on her mother,
 plans for an Infiltration Unit 8,
 an episode referencing the fan theory that Agent West was a descendant of Wally West by temporarily giving him super-speed.

Legacy

Influence
Despite the show's relative obscurity, The Zeta Project has made its way into many other DC projects. Early synthoid models bearing the resemblance of Zeta from his appearance in Batman Beyond and named Z-8s were seen in Justice League and Justice League Unlimited as a means of showing the evolution of government robots in the DCAU. In 2013, Zeta appeared in Batman Beyond Unlimited #16 as part of the new Terrific Trio, alongside Plastic Man and Batman Beyond villain Earth Mover. The seventh and eighth seasons of Arrow featured a 2040s set future where a company named Galaxy One unleashed robot soldiers named Zeta. In 2021, Young Justice mentioned The Zeta Project in the episode "Needful". The AI in 2022's Batman Unburied was named Zeta, after The Zeta Project.

Accolades

Music
As with other DCAU shows before it, The Zeta Project was scored by Lolita Ritmanis, Michael McCuistion, Kristopher Carter, and supervising composer Shirley Walker.  Working concurrently with the final season of Batman Beyond, for Zeta's first season, the Walker team worked to compose original music for each episode that blended the sound  of a live orchestra composed of musicians hired from American Federation of Musicians Local 47, with more contemporary electronic elements the team recorded in their own studio.

According to McCuistion, "Each episode was a different take, musically, and there were some threads of course, but I remember several of them having different musical environments, and that was really interesting creatively. [...] it certainly didn’t share any of the flavor of Batman Beyond in terms of music, I don’t think. It was very futuristic and very fun, but yeah, it didn’t have that sort of gritty, underworld cultural thing going on."

The Zeta Project was the final show the Dynamic Music Partners (Ritmanis, McCuistion, Carter) had a live orchestra on, and played a hand in the Dynamic Music Partner's being hired to score Treyarch's Spider-Man

Emmy For Your Consideration CD Track Listing

Main Title 1:01
Making Contact 2:36
His Maker's Name 1:05
Ro & Zee Meet Again 1:09
Desperate Escape 1:31
Bucky's Parent Woes 1:26
Zeta Escapes 1:35
Sorben Institute 0:51
Hide and Seek 1:09
West Gets Closer 1:42
Perryville 0:24
System Down 1:18
Kid Genius? 0:49
Nice Guy 0:57
Sweet Revenge 0:56

Home video
First announced at Warner Home Video's annual Home Theater Forum chat in September 2008, WHV (via DC Comics and Warner Bros. Family Entertainment) released the first season of The Zeta Project as a 2-DVD set for Region 1 on March 17, 2009. The bonus material for the set was handled by Retrofit Films, who reached out to fans of the series to help field interview questions for the cast and crew. While the released disc featured a 16-minute documentary featurette, titled "The Making of Zeta", about the show's origin with commentary from the voice cast and production staff, the original press release stated the set would include a since unreleased 15–20 minute featurette titled "Finding Freedom", a roundtable discussion, in which the cast speculates on various theories of where the show would have gone while producer/show runner Robert Goodman and his team give the fans the definitive answers.

The second season was initially reported to be on the way as early as December 2008. The following month, series creator Bob Goodman teased that bonus features for the season 2 set were filmed at the same time of the season 1 features, and later expanded that the season was slated to release in mid-2009 with a panel discussion featurette with Julie Nathanson, Liz Holzman, Joe Kuhr and himself that covered behind-the-scenes anecdotes. However, sales for season one did not meet Warner Home Video's expectations, resulting in the cancelation of the Season 2 release.

Alongside a re-printing of Season 1, Season 2 was finally announced for release by Warner Archive in February 2017 and arrived March 14, 2017. Attempts to locate the originally planned bonus features were unsuccessful, and they remain lost. To promote the release, Warner Archive held the "Warner Archive Collection's Kids' WB Flashback" panel at WonderCon Anaheim, featuring Diedrich Bader, Julie Nathanson, and Bob Goodman, as well as Phil LaMarr, who was representing WAC's recent Static Shock DVD releases.

Video game
Zeta Quest 3D was launched May 24, 2001. Advertised as a unique multi-environment, multi-level “walk-through” online video game, “Zeta Quest 3D,” let players assume the identity of Zeta, staying one step ahead of the NSA, while trying to clear his name. The game was built for the short lived CyberWorld QBORGs Browser System. According to Bob Goodman, he and Joe Kuhr contributed to vetting the writing process of the game. Not much is known about the plot, but many of the games original files are archived online and include a room named "IU8 Lab", suggesting the existence of an Infiltration Unit 8, as well as sprites of doctors seen in the episode "Absolute Zero".

See also

 Batman Beyond

References

External links
 
 
 The Zeta Project at The World's Finest

DC Animated Universe television series
Androids in television
American children's animated science fiction television series
American children's animated superhero television series
American animated television spin-offs
Kids' WB original shows
2000s American animated television series
2001 American television series debuts
2002 American television series endings
Animated television shows based on DC Comics
DC Comics robots
DC Comics superheroes
DC Comics television characters
Robot superheroes
Animated television series about robots
Television series by Warner Bros. Animation
Television series set in the future
Television series set in the 2030s
The WB original programming